Harry Aiken Vincent (1861-1931) was a largely self-taught American artist known for his plein air landscape paintings. Many of his oil paintings portrayed marine scenes at the start or end of the day, featuring boats and fishing activity in New England, particularly on Cape Ann, and in France. The treatment of water, sky, light and color in his works was representative of the American school of Impressionism. He was also skilled at water color and drawing in charcoal.

Vincent was born in Chicago and began his artistic career working for Thomas G. Moses of Sosman and Landis as a scenic painter for theaters, creating elaborate backdrops.

His earliest known oil paintings often depicted rural scenes of towns and farms outside of Chicago. In 1893 he exhibited at the World's Fair in Chicago. Vincent moved to the New York City area in the late 1890s, when his work increasingly drew the recognition of his peers and the attention of collectors. In 1907 he won the Shaw Prize awarded for a work in black and white by the Salmagundi Club. He also won the Turnbull Prize in 1918, and the Porter Prize in 1925. In 1928 he was recognized with the Samuel Twybill Shaw prize for watercolor. He also won the Paul L. Hammond prize given by the New York Watercolor Club for his painting "Rockport Harbor".

In the latter part of his career, until his death in 1931, Vincent lived in Rockport, Massachusetts, on Atlantic Avenue facing the inner harbor. He became a respected senior member of the Rockport Art Association, which he helped to found in 1921, serving as its first President, and the North Shore Art Association. Like other Cape Ann artists, he created many views of Gloucester harbor, and interpretations of an iconic fish shack on a wharf in Rockport, known fondly as Motif Number One. Street scenes and landscapes of the local granite quarries also attracted his eye, but he was continuously drawn to seaside settings.

In the 1920s he found new subjects through travels in Europe, including England, Italy (Venice and Chioggia) and France (St Tropez, Menton). While in Brittany, he produced a series of scenes of Concarneau, a small fishing village.

Harry Vincent was married twice, to Catherine F. Ryan in Chicago in 1884, with whom he had two children, and then to Mildred Deitz in New York in 1916.

References

1861 births
1931 deaths
Artists from Chicago
Impressionist artists
20th-century American painters
21st-century American painters
Painters from Illinois